David Aitken FRSE (1796–1875) was a Scottish minister and church historian.

Life

He was born on 17 August 1796 in or near Edinburgh. He was educated at the High School in Edinburgh then studied divinity at the University of Edinburgh. His main position as minister was at Minto in Roxburghshire from 1829 to 1866. His patron was the Earl of Minto. A letter of introduction from Thomas Carlyle aided in gaining this position.

He retired to 4 Charlotte Square in Edinburgh in 1866.

In 1868 he was elected a Fellow of the Royal Society of Edinburgh, his proposer being Sir David Brewster.

He died on 27 March 1875 at home, 4 Charlotte Square, a huge townhouse in one of the city's most prestigious addresses. He is buried in Dean Cemetery close to the ornate marble Leishman monument on the southern path. His house at Charlotte Square was purchased by Very Rev George Ritchie.

Family
In 1836 he married Elizabeth ("Bess") Stodart of Dunsyre (1793-1869). She was the niece of John Bradfute, a bookseller living at 22 George Square and was a friend of Thomas Carlyle's wife, Jane Welsh Carlyle, who lived at 23 George Square.

Artistic support
He is listed as a patron of John Kay's famous book of Edinburgh characters.

References

1796 births
1875 deaths
Clergy from Edinburgh
Alumni of New College, Edinburgh
19th-century Ministers of the Church of Scotland
Fellows of the Royal Society of Edinburgh